Eupithecia pauxillaria, the parsimonious pug, is a moth in the  family Geometridae. It is found in most of Europe, except Ireland, Great Britain, Portugal and northern Europe and the central part of the Balkan Peninsula.

The wingspan is 19–22 mm. Adults are on wing from June to October.

The larvae feed on Odontites (including Odontites lutea) and Euphrasia species. Larvae can be found in September and October.

References

External links
Lepiforum.de

Moths described in 1840
pauxillaria
Moths of Europe
Taxa named by Jean Baptiste Boisduval